VLOTT is a minor Belgian right-wing liberal or fortuynist political party. Its title, VLOTT, is an acronym for "Flemish, Liberal, Independent, Tolerant, Transparent" (Vlaams, Liberaal, Onafhankelijk, Tolerant, Transparant). It was founded on 23 November 2005 by ex-Open VLD member Hugo Coveliers. It participated in a list-cartel with the Vlaams Belang in the October 2006 Antwerp municipal elections and in selected provincial, municipal and district elections elsewhere in Flanders. Despite the popularity of their founder in Antwerp (13 623 personal votes, 3rd most popular) the shared effort of the cartel-partners did only result in a small 0.5 percent win, with no extra seat in the city-council. In 2007, VLOTT did not participate in the general elections, but their candidates appeared as independents on the Vlaams Belang ballots. Only founder Hugo Coveliers was elected to the Belgian Senate. After Coveliers withdrawal from active politics early 2012 Vlaams Belang stopped its cooperation with the party.

Platform
The VLOTT party advocates the independence of Flanders. Democracy and individual liberalism are central tenets of its principles. The party opposes multi-culturalism. Many of the party's policies were originally influenced by that of Dutch politician Pim Fortuyn and his Pim Fortuyn List party.

References

External links
  
  Official VLOTT Antwerp Campaign website
  Cartel Campaign website for the joint VLOTT-Vlaams Belang list for the  Antwerp elections

Flemish political parties in Belgium
Right-wing populism in Belgium
National liberal parties
Nationalist parties in Belgium